A Grande Arte (in English, The Great Art; US title: Exposure), is a 1991 Brazilian movie directed by Walter Salles Jr. and starring Peter Coyote. Loosely based on the book A Grande Arte by Brazilian Rubem Fonseca, it is one of the first theatrical works of Salles Jr. The cast includes Brazilian and international stars such as Coyote, Tchéky Karyo and Amanda Pays.

Plot 
Peter Mandrake (Coyote), an American photographer in Brazil, is preparing an in loco essay for his new book, about the "train surfers" (groups of boys who court danger "surfing" on the roof of the trains) in the city of Rio de Janeiro. A local call girl with whom he is friends is murdered, and when the police can make no progress Mandrake decides to investigate himself. Subsequently, two hired thugs break into his apartment demanding a disk, and, when he doesn't produce it because he can't do so, they rape his girlfriend and stab him, leaving him to die. Vowing revenge, Mandrake enlists the help of Hermes (Karyo), a professional knife fighter who owes Mandrake a debt, to teach him the art of knife-fighting. The obsession this develops into causes Mandrake's girlfriend to leave him, wanting the whole thing to simply go away, but Mandrake refuses to let go.

The thugs are discovered to be working for an undisclosed Brazilian criminal organization closely tied with the Bolivian cocaine cartel. The head of the organization is attempting to uncover a traitor in his organization, who apparently stole a floppy disk containing important information. Mandrake allies himself with some of the organization's rivals to help them find the disk, in return for discovering who killed the call girl. The disk is ultimately found, and Mandrake learns that the organization head murdered the call girl himself, slashing her face in an act of arrogance. Hermes appears suddenly, and the head orders him to kill Mandrake, but Hermes tells him to do it himself before leaving. They violently fight, and Mandrake manages to stab his opponent to death.

However, the fulfillment of his revenge quest leaves Mandrake feeling empty and without purpose. He wanders for a while before, on a whim, taking a picture of a couple kissing in a window. This reinvigorates his passion for photography, and, whereas he used to take pictures of violent and dangerous situations, now his work has a theme of love and simple pleasures. He heads out to the plains to see his girlfriend, who is an archaeologist working on-site. After showing her the pictures, he tells her he's been assigned to Africa, but promises to return someday.

Knife culture

The film explores the mysterious and hidden world of the "Persevs" (a portmanteau of the words perforate and sever) fighters and some famous knifesmiths, such as Rex Applegate and William. E. Fairbairn, Bo Randall (whose assault knife "Randall 14" is a key weapon in the film) and Joe Kious.

Cast 
Peter Coyote as Peter Mandrake, the photographer
Tchéky Karyo as Hermes, the knife fight master
Amanda Pays as Mariet, Mandrake's girlfriend
Raul Cortez as Thales de Lima Prado
Giulia Gam as Gisela the hooker
Tonico Pereira as Rafael
Eduardo Conde as Roberto Mitry
Miguel Ángel Fuentes as Camilo Fuentes

Production 
The movie was filmed on location on Rio de Janeiro streets (usually at night) and in the highlands of Bolivia and Pantanal. It was the first feature film directed by Walter Salles Jr., who had been known primarily for his documentaries. He later directed films such as Diários de Motocicleta (The Motorcycle Diaries) and the horror remake Dark Water.

External links

1991 films
1991 crime thriller films
English-language Brazilian films
Films directed by Walter Salles
Films set on trains
Films scored by Jürgen Knieper
1991 directorial debut films